Gisbert Horsthemke (born 26 January 1953) is a retired German football midfielder.

References

External links
 

1953 births
Living people
German footballers
Bundesliga players
2. Bundesliga players
Oberliga (football) players
Landesliga players
VfL Bochum II players
VfL Bochum players
SpVgg Erkenschwick players
Place of birth missing (living people)
Association football midfielders